Prakash Thuminad is an Indian film actor who works in Kannada cinema. He also the SIIMA award for best comedian in 2019 for his role in the film Sarkari Hi. Pra. Shaale, Kasaragodu, Koduge: Ramanna Rai.

He is associated with the Kannada film, Ondu Motteya Kathe (2017), a romantic drama directed by Raj B. Shetty. In 2018, he appeared alongside Diganth and Pooja Devariya, in Senna Hegde's Kannada drama Katheyondu Shuruvagide. His performance in Sarkari Hi. Pra. Shaale, Kasaragodu, Koduge: Ramanna Rai was highly praised, that same year. His 2019 release included Lungi. He played the role of a bank manager in Kshamisi Nimma Khaatheyalli Hanavilla, starring Diganth and Aindrita Ray.

Filmography

References 

Living people
Year of birth missing (living people)
Kannada male actors
Male actors in Tulu cinema